is a 1963 Japanese jidaigeki (period drama) film directed by Eiichi Kudo.

Plot
In 1844, the Tokugawa shogunate in Japan is in a period of transition, and one of the high ranking lords,  Lord Matsudaira, has become tainted by his dissolute and reprobate misconduct. Many leaders in the governing community of the current government feel that the code of honor, bushido, of the samurai is being disgraced by Matsudaira. His reprobate, egotistical, and feckless lifestyle is disgusting to those who come into close contact with him. After receiving reports, Sir Doi is convinced that Matsudaira represents a severe threat to the entire code of honor for the samurai tradition. Sir Doi decides, because of the severity of Matsudaira's misconduct, to take a blood oath to assassinate the reprobate Lord Matsudaira. He enlists a troop of assassins to swear a similar blood oath to do away with Matsudaira in order to restore his country's wellbeing and code of honor.

Cast

 as Narrator
Chiezō Kataoka as Shinzaemon Shimada
Kōtarō Satomi as Shinrokurō Shimada
Ryōhei Uchida as Hanbei kitou
Tetsurō Tanba as Doi Toshitsura
Satomi Oka

Junko Fuji as Kayo

Seishiro Sawamura

Shingo Yamashiro as Koyata Kiga
Kōshirō Harada

Ryūji Kita
Ryōsuke Kagawa
Kantarō Suga as Naritsugu

Tsukie Matsuura
Noboru Aihara
Masao Hori
Kinnosuke Takamatsu
 as Horii

Mitsugu Fujii
Ryōzō Tanaka
Kandō Arashi
Kunio Hikita
Kyōnosuke Murai
Masuo Kamiki
Jun Harukawa
Ren Takahashi
Ryōnosuke Doi
Masaru Fujiwara
Isamu Dobashi
Hiroshi Kasuga
Kanjūrō Arashi as Saheita Kuranaga
Kō Nishimura as Kujūrō Hirayama
Ryūnosuke Tsukigata as Makino
Isao Natsuyagi (uncredited)

Remake

The film was remade in 2010 by Takashi Miike. The remake was met with critical acclaim. BFI, in an assessment of the top ten samurai films, compared the remake of the film to the original version stating: "Set in 1844, 13 Assassins follows the Seven Samurai template, featuring a band of samurais who come together to overthrow a despotic lord for the greater good of society. Miike’s version benefits from a far more generous budget, with a wonderful attention to period sets and costumes and some inventively choreographed fight scenes."

References

External links 
 

1963 films
Jidaigeki films
1960s historical action films
Japanese historical action films
Films directed by Eiichi Kudo
Samurai films
Toei Company films
Films scored by Akira Ifukube
1960s martial arts films
1960s Japanese-language films
1960s Japanese films